Paraivongius costatus is a species of leaf beetle of the Democratic Republic of the Congo and West Africa. It was first described by Martin Jacoby in 1894.

References

Eumolpinae
Beetles of Africa
Beetles of the Democratic Republic of the Congo
Insects of West Africa
Beetles described in 1894
Taxa named by Martin Jacoby